Giulia Formenton (born 16 March 1998) is an Italian female canoeist who won six medals at senior level at the Wildwater Canoeing World Championships.

References

External links
 

1998 births
Living people
Italian female canoeists
Sportspeople from Venice
21st-century Italian women